This is a list of episodes for the PBS documentary television series Wide Angle.

Season 1: 2002

Season 2: 2003

Season 3: 2004

2005 special

Season 4: 2005

Season 5: 2006

2007 special

Season 6: 2007

Season 7: 2008

Season 8: 2009

Notes

References

Wide Angle episodes